Krochmal is a rare Polish surname meaning "laundry starch" (a starch solution in water used to whiten and stiffen fabric) . Notable people with the surname include:

 Menachem Mendel Krochmal (c. 1600 – 1661), Polish-Moravian rabbi
 Nachman Krochmal (1785–1840), Galician philosopher, theologian and historian

Few families today are known to have the surname, with those that are known primarily living in the United States and Australia.

Jewish surnames
Polish-language surnames
Yiddish-language surnames